Between the 1870s and 1890s, the Italian  (Royal Navy) built a series of torpedo cruisers, as part of a program intended to strengthen the fleet during a period of limited naval budgets. A total of six different classes comprising eighteen vessels were constructed. The first vessel, was laid down in 1875, and was one of the first torpedo cruisers built by any navy. She proved to be a disappointment in service, being too slow to be an effective warship.  was followed by the more successful design, which provided the basis for the four s and the eight-vessel . The four s were built on an experimental basis, with  being used as the basis for the s. While those vessels were being built, a pair of smaller vessels—the —were ordered. Like , the  class was too slow for its intended role.

Most of the Italian torpedo cruisers served during the relatively uneventful 1880s, 1890s, and 1900s, and as a result, saw little activity outside of routine training operations. By the early 1900s, many of the cruisers had been reduced to subsidiary roles or had been discarded outright. The surviving vessels still in service during World War I saw no offensive operations, though four—, and —that had been converted into minelayers, were employed to help blockade the Austro-Hungarian Navy in the Adriatic Sea.  was torpedoed and sunk by a German U-boat in March 1918, the only Italian torpedo cruiser to be lost to hostile action. Long since obsolete by the early 1920s, the remaining torpedo cruisers were then sold for scrap. Their place in the fleet's reconnaissance force was taken by a group of German and Austro-Hungarian light cruisers that were acquired as war reparations.



In the aftermath of the Italian fleet's defeat at the Battle of Lissa in 1866, the Italian parliament drastically reduced naval budgets. By the 1870s, the small budgets precluded the acquisition of a large battle fleet centered on new ironclads like the  then under construction, and so Admiral Simone Antonio Saint-Bon, then the Italian Minister of the Navy, ordered a small, fast vessel that was armed with torpedoes. The new vessel was one of the first torpedo cruisers to be built by any navy. Her flat-bottomed hull prevented her from reaching her intended speed, which meant that she would be unable to catch the ironclads she was intended to destroy. She spent little time in active service as a result, and the Italian navy did not build another torpedo cruiser for almost another decade. In November 1893, the navy sold the vessel and she was subsequently broken up.

 served with the Italian fleet until 1910, during which time she participated in extensive fleet training exercises that helped to develop Italian naval doctrine and tactics. She was modernized in 1897–1898, receiving new boilers and a modified bow, among other changes. In 1910, she was converted into a minelayer. She served in this capacity during the Italo-Turkish War of 1911–1912 but she saw no action during the conflict. She remained in service through World War I, during which the Italian fleet made extensive use of minefields to keep the Austro-Hungarian Navy contained in the narrow waters of the Adriatic Sea.  remained in the fleet's inventory until 1923, when she was discarded and broken up for scrap. By that time, she was the last Italian torpedo cruiser, having served for more than thirty-six years.

class

Brin continued his experimentation with the  class, adopting different hull forms, propulsion systems, and light gun batteries to determine the most effective configuration for the new warship type.

Like , the four s served with the fleet and participated in training exercises. These exercises frequently gamed the problem of a French naval attack on various Italian ports, France then being Italy's most likely adversary, owing to Italy's membership in the Triple Alliance with Germany and Austria-Hungary. When not conducting maneuvers, the ships were frequently placed in reserve to reduce operational costs.

class

The next class of torpedo cruisers built for the Italian fleet, the  class, marked further experimentation on the part of Brin. These two ships were significantly smaller than the other torpedo cruisers Brin designed, though they still carried an armament of three torpedo tubes, and they were nearly as fast as the s. They were not particularly successful vessels and their design was not repeated in future torpedo cruisers.

class

The designers conducted further tests with the ships' armaments, and  received a second 4.7-inch gun.

Like the other Italian torpedo cruisers, the  class spent much of its career with the fleet conducting training exercises. In the 1890s,  and  participated in naval demonstrations off Crete in attempts by the Great Powers to prevent conflicts between Greece and the Ottoman Empire over control of the island. Several members of the class saw action during the Italo-Turkish War, primarily shelling Ottoman positions in North Africa.  briefly engaged the Ottoman torpedo cruiser  in the Red Sea.

class

The design for the  class was prepared in the mid-1890s, with work beginning on the two new cruisers in early 1897. The two new cruisers were significantly larger than previous designs, though they discarded the medium-caliber guns that had been adopted in the  design. The thickness of armor protection and the number of torpedo tubes were reduced as well. Intended to be scouts for the main battle fleet,  and  nevertheless proved to be too slow in service to be usable in that role. As a result, their careers were limited. They saw action during the Italo-Turkish War, where they provided gunfire support to Italian troops in North Africa. Neither ship saw combat during World War I, and after the war, they were withdrawn from fleet service. The Italian fleet received a group of former German and Austro-Hungarian light cruisers as war reparations, and these vessels replaced the torpedo and protected cruisers in the fleet's reconnaissance forces in the 1920s.  became a minelayer, while  was reclassified as a gunboat, in 1919 and 1920, respectively. Neither ship remained in service for very long, with  being sold for scrap a year after her conversion, and  joining her in 1923.

Notes

References

External links
 Incrociatori Marina Militare website 

Italy
Cruisers, torpedo